Quincy's Got a Brand New Bag is a studio album by record producer, arranger and musician, Quincy Jones, featuring instrumental arrangements of contemporary pop/R&B hits which was recorded in late 1965 at RPM International Studios and engineered in part by Ray Charles, who performed on many tracks.

Track listing
 "Ain't That Peculiar" (Pete Moore, Smokey Robinson, Bobby Rogers, Marv Tarplin)— 2:52
 "I Got You (I Feel Good)" (James Brown) — 3:41
 "I Hear A Symphony" (Lamont Dozier, Eddie Holland) — 3:08
 "A Lover's Concerto" (Sandy Linzer, Denny Randell) — 2:23
 "Baby Cakes" (Jones) — 4:06
 "Mohair Sam" (Dallas Frazier) — 2:13
 "Something About You" (Holland-Dozier-Holland) — 3:03
 "Boss Bird" (Bobby Scott) — 3:21
 "Hang on Sloopy" (Bert Russell, Wes Farrell) — 2:14
 "Fever" (Eddie Cooley, John Davenport) — 2:25
 "Harlem Nocturne" (Earle Hagen, Dick Rogers) — 2:37
 "Papa's Got a Brand New Bag" (Brown) — 2:11

Personnel
On tracks 1, 2, 4, 5, 6, 7, 10, 12 :
 Bobby Bryant — Trumpet
 Jack Kelso — Alto saxophone
 Plas Johnson — Tenor Saxophone
 Jewel Grant — Baritone Saxophone
 Urbie Green — Trombone
 Kenny Schroyer - Bass Trombone
 Carol Kaye - Bass
 Rene Hall - Guitar
 Arthur Knight — Guitar
 Ray Charles — Piano and Organ
 Mike Rubini — Piano and Organ
 Gary Coleman — Percussion

On Tracks 3, 8, 9, 11 :
 Bobby Scott — Leader and Piano
 Jerome Richardson — Tenor Saxophone and Flute
 Joe Newman — Trumpet
 Grady Tate — Drums
 Ben Tucker — Bass
 Ray Barretto — Conga Drum and Bongos

On all tracks :

Engineers: Ray Charles, Joe Adams, Rudy Hill

References

1965 albums
Quincy Jones albums
Mercury Records albums